Balesur, also rendered as Balehsur or Balah Sur, may refer to:
 Balesur-e Olya
 Balesur-e Sofla